Great Bear Lake Water Aerodrome  is located  south of the lodge on the Dease Arm of Great Bear Lake, Northwest Territories, Canada. It is open from mid-July until September.

See also
Great Bear Lake Airport

References

Airports in the Arctic
Registered aerodromes in the Sahtu Region
Seaplane bases in the Northwest Territories